The Sacred Gate (Hiera Pyle) was a gate in the city wall of Classical Athens, in the modern neighbourhood of Kerameikos. Its name derives from the Sacred Way that led from it to Eleusis, the site of the Eleusinian Mysteries. The site is uniquely well preserved for Athens, and shows clear evidence of the successive building phases from the 5th century BC to the 1st century AD. The Eridanos river passed through the gate in a channel.

References

Sources

External links
 3d reconstruction of the city wall in the Keremikos area, by Ancient Athens 3D

City gates in Greece
Classical Athens
Ancient Greek buildings and structures in Athens
Kerameikos
City walls of Athens